Raymond Page may refer to:

 R. I. Page (1924–2012), British historian
 Raymond E. Page (1895–1992), American landscape architect\